The Bright Angel Trail is a hiking trail located in Grand Canyon National Park in the U.S. state of Arizona.

Description

The trail originates at Grand Canyon Village on the south rim of the Grand Canyon, descending 4380 feet to the Colorado River.  It has an average grade of 10% along its entire length.  At trail's end, the River Trail continues another 1.9 miles to the Bright Angel Campground and Phantom Ranch.  These two trails combined are the most common method used to access Phantom Ranch by hikers and mules.

The second is the River Trail, which officially begins when the Bright Angel Trail reaches the Colorado River at the River Resthouse (although some consider that the Bright Angel Trail officially ends after crossing the Colorado River at the Silver Bridge).

Condition
Grand Canyon National Park categorizes the Bright Angel Trail as a corridor trail.  With this designation it receives regular maintenance and patrols by park rangers.

Water availability
Water is available from the trans-canyon pipeline at the Mile-and-a-half Resthouse, the Three Mile Resthouse, and Havasupai Gardens.  During cooler months (usually October–April) the two higher elevation resthouses are shut off from the water supply to prevent the pipeline from freezing.

Below Havasupai Gardens, both Garden Creek and Pipe Creek flow year-round (perennial).  Water is also available at the River Resthouse from the Colorado River.  All water from natural sources must be filtered, treated, or boiled prior to consuming.

Camping

Hikers can camp at Havasupai Gardens Campground or at the Bright Angel Campground.  At either site, they can stay overnight with a permit issued by the Grand Canyon National Park Backcountry Information Center. Overnight use of the campgrounds is regulated by the National Park Service, and they call for a maximum number of groups (7 to 11 people) and parties (1 to 6 people), as well as a maximum total number of persons.

Use permits are available on a first-come, first-served basis from the park's Backcountry Information Center.  Requests are taken beginning on the 1st day of the month, up to four months before the requested first night of camping.

Hazards
Hazards that hikers can encounter along the Bright Angel Trail include dehydration, hyperhydration, sudden rainstorms, flash flooding, loose footing, bootpacked ice, rockfall, encounters with wildlife, and extreme heat.  At the Colorado River, additional hazards include hypothermia (due to the river's consistently cold temperatures), trauma (due to collisions with boulders in rapids), and drowning.
Also, the trail is used by the mules transporting people and gear to and from the bottom of the canyon. Although these mules are highly trained, the trail is narrow in some places, and care must be given to give mules the right of way.  The trail also has many switchbacks, and a bad fall can result in serious injuries. Squirrel bites at Plateau Point are the leading cause of animal injuries to park visitors.

History

Havasupai
The upper part of the trail was originally built by the Havasupai people for access to the perennial water source of present-day Garden Creek.  The Havasupai settled seasonally in this area, previously known as Indian Garden (or Indian Gardens). In 1903, President Theodore Roosevelt ordered them to leave the area, to make way for a park. However, it was not until 1928 that the last Havasupai left, forced out by the National Park Service.

In November 2022 the U.S. Board on Geographic Names approved a name change to Havasupai Gardens requested by the National Park Service on behalf of the Havasupai tribe, who regarded the old name as offensive and a painful reminder of past injustices. A ceremony highlighting the new name was planned for spring 2023.

Ralph Cameron

Ralph H. Cameron, who would later become a United States senator (R-AZ 1921–27), settled on the canyon rim in 1890 and began improving the old Havasupai trail.  It was at this time that the trail was extended all the way to the Colorado River.  Once official control of the trail fell to Cameron, he named it the Bright Angel Trail, commonly referred to in its early years as Cameron's Trail, and began charging a $1 toll to access it, plus additional fees for drinking water and the use of outhouses at Havasupai Gardens.

Kolb brothers
Ellsworth Kolb arrived at the Grand Canyon to work at the Bright Angel Hotel in 1901.  He was employed as a bellboy.  The next year, Ellsworth invited his brother Emery to come to the canyon as the possibility of mine work opened up.  However, John Hance's asbestos mine closed before he arrived, leaving Emery unemployed.

Shortly after this, Emery discovered a photography business for sale in Williams, Arizona. He and Ellsworth began taking photographs of visitors who took the mule rides down Cameron's trail, charging a fee for the pictures. The Cameron family leased a small piece of land nearby to Emery, where the two brothers set up a photography studio in a tent to develop and sell their photos.

The business was profitable and after a few years the Kolb brothers built their permanent studio building on the rim of the canyon.  Rock was blasted away to provide the foundation for the building, which is perched slightly below rim level.

Ellsworth left the venture in 1924, but Emery continued operating the studio until his death in 1976.  The present-day Kolb Studio is operated by the Grand Canyon Association as a gift shop, art studio, and history center.

Competition with Cameron
To compete with Cameron, the Atchison, Topeka and Santa Fe Railway improved an existing horsethief trail in Hermit Canyon (the Hermit Trail) in 1911.  In 1924, the newly created National Park Service began construction of the South Kaibab Trail near Yaki Point as an additional bypass for Cameron's tolls.

National Park Service Control
After a long series of legal battles, the trail was turned over to the National Park Service in 1928.

See also
List of trails in Grand Canyon National Park

References

External links

 Grand Canyon National Park, Official site
 Grand Canyon Explorer
 Bright Angel Trail

Hiking trails in Grand Canyon National Park
National Recreation Trails in Arizona
National Park Service rustic in Arizona
Havasupai